Chriodorus atherinoides (hardhead halfbeak) is a species of halfbeak found in coastal waters of the western Atlantic Ocean from southern United States to Mexico including Cuba and the Bahamas. This species is euryhaline and frequently migrates up rivers. It is of no commercial value. Unlike most other halfbeaks, the upper and lower jaws are of a similar size.

References

Hemiramphidae
Monotypic fish genera
Fish described in 1882